Moyamensing is an area of Philadelphia established as a Moyamensing Township during British colonial rule on the fast land of the Neck, lying between Passyunk and Wicaco. It was incorporated into Philadelphia County, Pennsylvania and today encompasses several neighborhoods along the Moyamensing Avenue corridor in the South Philadelphia section of Philadelphia.

History

Originally Lenape Nation land, the tract was granted by the Dutch West India Company Lieutenant Alexander d'Hinoyossa, Vice-Director of New Amstel to Marten Roseman (aka Marten Cleinsmit), William Stille and Lawrence Andries. In 1684, when the land was turned over from the Dutch to the English, the title was given by William Penn to William Stille, Lassey Andrews, Andrew Bankson and John Matson.

Moyamensing Township included this ground and Wicaco except such parts of the latter as were included in Southwark. Its northern boundary was South Street and below the existing parts of Southwark; its eastern boundary was the Delaware River, and its western boundary was Schuylkill Sixth (Seventeenth Street).

In 1816 the greatest length of Moyamensing was estimated to be 3 miles; the greatest breadth, 2 miles; area, 2,560 acres (10 km²). By act of March 24, 1812, the inhabitants of Moyamensing were incorporated by the style of "the commissioners and inhabitants of the township of Moyamensing" and they even had their own police force. By act of April 4, 1831, the township was divided into East and West Moyamensing. The township was one of the earliest created after the settlement of Pennsylvania, and became part of Philadelphia in 1854.

The Moyamensing Prison was built between 1822 and 1835 at Reed and 10th Streets. A portion of it also housed a debtors' prison. The structure was demolished in 1967.

References

Other sources
Walther, Rudolph J. Happenings in Ye Olde Philadelphia 1680-1900 (Philadelphia, PA: Walther Printing House, 1925)
Craig, Peter Stebbins Olof Persson Stille and his Family  (Philadelphia, PA:  Swedish Colonial News. Volume 1, Number 16. Fall 1997)

External links
District of Moyamensing Documents

Neighborhoods in Philadelphia
Municipalities in Philadelphia County prior to the Act of Consolidation, 1854
Populated places established in 1820
1820 establishments in Pennsylvania
1854 disestablishments in Pennsylvania
South Philadelphia